Cadorino, a dialect of Ladin, is the language of Cadore, at the feet of the Dolomites in the province of Belluno. It is distinct from neighboring dialects, and though it has received relatively little attention, it is important to an understanding of the linguistic history of northern Italy.

Morphophonology 

The principal characteristics of Cadorino are the following:

 Palatalization of *ka, *ga to č, ǧ.
 Retention of final -s in verbal 2nd-person singular.
 Velarization of *l to u before a consonant.
 Vowel breaking of "è" in closed syllables.
 The inflection "òu" of the passive participle of verbs of the first conjugation.
 Retention of a case distinction in 1sg and 2sg pronouns (ió and tū in the nominative, compared to mi and ti in Venetian).

These are all characteristics of Ladin dialects.

Influences 

Cadorino is spoken in what had once been Paleo-Venetian territory. Toponyms show a strong Celtic presence. There was a Friulian presence around 500 CE, and Cadorino preserves various particularities of Friulian. Over the centuries (Modern) Venetian has expanded into the Cadorino area. While other Ladin varieties were profoundly influenced by Tyrolian dialects of German, these had relatively little influence on Cadorino, which was much more affected by Venetian.

Recognition 

Thanks to legislation on the recognition of historical linguistic minorities (Law 482/1999), Cadore is recognized by the province of Belluno along with the dialects of Comelico, Agordino, the high valley of Cordevole, and the Val di Zoldo.

Notes

Bibliography 

 Ascoli Graziadio Isaia, Saggi ladini, "Archivio Glottologico Italiano", I, 1873.
 Giovan Battista Pellegrini, I dialetti ladino-cadorini, Miscellanea di studi alla memoria di Carlo Battisti, Firenze, Istituto di studi per l'Alto Adige, 1979, pp. 245–265
 Giovan Battista Pellegrini, Il museo Archeologico cadorino e il Cadore preromano e romano, pp. 215–238, Magnifica Comunità di Cadore – Regione Veneto, 1991
 Giovan Battista Pellegrini, La genesi del retoromanzo (o ladino), Max Niemeyer Verlag Tübingen, 1991
 Carlo Battisti, Prefazione al vocabolario ampezzano di A. Majoni del 1929
 Loredana Corrà, Una breve nota linguistica
 Giovan Battista Pellegrini, Studi storico-linguistici bellunesi e alpini, Archivio storico di Belluno, Feltre e Cadore, 1992
Anna Marinetti, Aspetti della romanizzazione linguistica nella Cisalpina orientale, Patria diversis gentibus una? Unità politica e identità etniche nell’Italia antica, PISA, ETS, 2008
Maria Teresa Vigolo – Paola Barbierato, Convergenze cadorino-friulane in ambito toponomastico, Atti del secondo convegno di Toponomastica Friulana (Udine 22 e 23 novembre 2002), in Quaderni di toponomastica friulana, Società Filologica Friulana, Udine 2007.

External links
Cadorino poetry
 Istituto Ladin de la Dolomites
 Algudnei - spazi per la cultura ladina del Comelico
 Comelico Cultura - Sezion ladina dal Comelgo
 Union Ladina d'Oltreciusa
 Union ladina del Cadore de Medo
 Il ladino cadorino nei documenti giuridici tardo medievali e nelle parlate odierne
 Informazioni sul dialetto cadorino (Ladinia - I parte)
 Informazioni sul dialetto cadorino (Ladinia - II parte)
 L'insegnamento nelle scuole
 La Carta dei Dialetti d'Italia elaborata da Giovan Battista Pellegrini (Pisa, Pacini editore 1977)
 Dizionario della gente di Lozzo - La parlata ladina di Lozzo di Cadore
 Femenes - Vita quotidiana delle donne ladine nel Cadore di un tempo

Ladin language